Myrmica aloba is a species of ant that can be found in France, Portugal, and Spain.

References

Myrmica
Insects described in 1909
Fauna of the Iberian Peninsula